Silvanus is a given name and surname. Notable people with the name include:

Marcus Plautius Silvanus (1st-century BC–1st-century AD), Roman consul in 2 BC
Tiberius Plautius Silvanus Aelianus, a Roman patrician serving twice as consul (45 AD, 74 AD)
Marcus Caeionius Silvanus (born c. 120), Roman consul in 156 AD
Saint Silvanus, also known as Silas, an early Christian and companion of Paul
Silvanus of the Seventy, another early Christian and traditionally among Jesus' seventy apostles
Saint Silvanus (or Sylvanus), was one of the seven sons of Saint Felicitas of Rome (2nd century)
Abba Silvanus, one of the Desert Fathers
Silvanus (magister peditum), Roman general and usurper against Constantius II
Silvanus of Ahun (Silvain, Sylvanus, died 407), 5th-century martyr
Claudius Silvanus (died 355), Frankish usurper in 355
Silvanus Bevan (1691–1765), 18th century apothecary
Silvanus Melea Otieno (1931–1986), posthumously controversial Kenyan lawyer
Silvanus Trevail (1851–1903), Cornish architect
Silvanus P. Thompson (1851–1916), physicist, engineer and author
Silouan the Athonite (1866–1938), also known as Saint Silvanus the Athonite
Colonel Sylvanus Thayer (1785–1872), "Father of the United States Military Academy"

Silvanus (praetorian prefect), a Roman officer of the Third Century AD
Silvanus Njambari (born 1974), retired Namibian footballer with Black Africa F.C.. 
Silvino Bercellino (born 1946), retired Italian football player
Silvino Francisco (born 1946), retired South African professional snooker player
Silvino Gomes Soares (born 1978), Cape Verdean football striker
Silvino Louro (born 1959), is a retired Portuguese footballer who played as a goalkeeper
Syl Apps (1915-1998), a Canadian professional ice hockey player
Sylvanus Bowser (19th-century–1938), widely credited with inventing the automobile fuel pump
Sylvanus C. Breyfogel (born 1851), American Bishop of the Evangelical Association
Sylvanus Dung Dung (born 1949), former field hockey player from India
Sylvanus H. Sweet (1830–1899), American civil engineer and politician from New York. He was New York State Engineer and Surveyor from 1874 to 1875
Sylvanus Lowry (died 1865), slave owning Southern aristocrat from Kentucky who reigned as the political boss of Saint Cloud, Minnesota
Sylvanus Morgan (1620 – March 27, 1693), English arms-painter and author
Sylvanus Morley (1883–1948), American archaeologist, epigrapher, and Mayanist scholar
Sylvanus Ngele, Senator for the Ebonyi North constituency of Ebonyi State, Nigeria 
Sylvanus Okpala (born 1961), retired Nigerian football midfielder
Sylvanus Olympio (1902–1963), Togolese political figure who served as Prime Minister, and then President, of Togo from 1958 until his assassination in 1963
Sylvanus Percival Vivian (1880–1958), 7th Registrar General of England and Wales (1921–1945)
Sylvanus T. Rugg (1834–1881), officer in the Union Army who commanded an artillery battery at the Battle of Gettysburg during the American Civil War
Sylvanus Wear (1858–1920), English naturalist who settled in Belfast in 1904
Sylvanus William Godon (1809–1879), American naval officer who served in the Mexican–American and American Civil Wars
Sylvanus Wood (1604–1675), English politician who sat in the House of Commons in 1654

Fictional
Silvanus Kettleburn, the former Care of Magical Creatures teacher in the Harry Potter novel series
Sylvanas Windrunner, the former Warchief of the Horde and leader of the Forsaken faction in the Warcraft video game series

Given names